Donald Lee Barnes (May 8, 1894 – July 20, 1962 in St. Louis, Missouri) was the owner of the St. Louis Browns of the American League from  through  when the team was sold to Richard Muckerman in 1945.

References

1894 births
1962 deaths
Major League Baseball executives
St. Louis Browns owners
Businesspeople from St. Louis
20th-century American businesspeople